Fitchburg is a city in Dane County, Wisconsin, United States. The population was 29,609 at the 2020 census. Fitchburg is a suburb of Madison and is part of the Madison Metropolitan Statistical Area. Fitchburg consists of a mix of suburban neighborhoods closer to the border with the city of Madison, commercial and industrial properties, and more rural properties in the southern portion of the city. Despite its status as an incorporated city, some rural parts of Fitchburg still lack certain municipal services such as sewer, water, and natural gas.

History
Fitchburg was a town until its incorporation as a city on April 26, 1983. Dutch immigrant brothers Vroman are claimed to be the first permanent settlers of Greenfield, then changed to Fitchburg to avoid confusion with Greenfield, Milwaukee county. A significant number of Irish families settled in Fitchburg as well. As the city of Madison began to encroach upon the town of Fitchburg via annexation, the town pursued incorporation as a city to halt Madison's expansion into the town. The fight to allow incorporation ultimately went to the Wisconsin State Supreme Court, which ruled that Fitchburg could incorporate as a city.

Former unincorporated communities
Fitchburg Center
Oak Hall

Geography

Climate

Demographics

As of 2000 the median income for a household in the city was $50,433, and the median income for a family was $64,106. Males had a median income of $37,440 versus $27,974 for females. The per capita income for the city was $27,317.  About 5.0% of families and 6.4% of the population were below the poverty line, including 7.2% of those under age 18 and 6.9% of those age 65 or over.

2010 census
As of the census of 2010, there were 25,260 people, 9,955 households, and 6,238 families living in the city. The racial makeup of the city was 72.2% White, 10.4% African American, 0.4% Native American, 4.9% Asian, 8.8% from other races, and 3.2% from two or more races. Hispanic or Latino of any race were 17.2% of the population.

There were 9,955 households, of which 33.6% had children under the age of 18 living with them, 47.4% were married couples living together, 10.5% had a female householder with no husband present, 4.7% had a male householder with no wife present, and 37.3% were non-families. 27.3% of all households were made up of individuals, and 5.4% had someone living alone who was 65 years of age or older. The average household size was 2.45 and the average family size was 3.03.

The median age in the city was 32.9 years. 24.5% of residents were under the age of 18; 9.4% were between the ages of 18 and 24; 33.1% were from 25 to 44; 25.3% were from 45 to 64; and 7.6% were 65 years of age or older. The gender makeup of the city was 51.6% male and 48.4% female.

Government

Aaron Richardson is the Mayor of Fitchburg, first elected in 2019 and re-elected to a three year term in 2020. Fitchburg is represented by Mark Pocan (D) in the United States House of Representatives, and by Ron Johnson (R) and Tammy Baldwin (D) in the United States Senate. Melissa Agard (D) and Jon Erpenbach (D) represent Fitchburg in the Wisconsin State Senate, and Jimmy Anderson (D) and Sondy Pope-Roberts (D) represent Fitchburg in the Wisconsin State Assembly.

City services
Fitchburg is served by the Fitchburg Police Department and Fitchburg Fire Department.  Emergency medical services are provided by the Fitch-Rona EMS district, which also serves the neighboring city and town of Verona. Various portions of Fitchburg are served by municipal sewer, water and natural gas utilities.

Notable people

 Jimmy P. Anderson, Wisconsin State Assembly, lives in Fitchburg
 Ada Deer, Native American advocate, scholar, former Assistant Secretary of the Interior, lives in Fitchburg
 Frances Huntley-Cooper, Former Mayor, lives in Fitchburg
 Elizabeth McCoy (microbiologist), Microbiologist and Professor, lived in Fitchburg
 Mahlon Mitchell, President of the Professional Firefighters of Wisconsin and 2018 Democratic candidate for Governor, lives in Fitchburg
 Roscoe Mitchell, Saxophonist and composer, lives in Fitchburg
 Homer A. Stone, Wisconsin State Assembly and farmer, was born in Fitchburg

References

External links
 City of Fitchburg

1983 establishments in Wisconsin
Populated places established in 1983
Cities in Wisconsin
Cities in Dane County, Wisconsin
Madison, Wisconsin, metropolitan statistical area